Amity Rockwell (also known as Amity Gregg; born May 28, 1993) is an American professional racing cyclist, who currently rides in mountain bike racing for the Easton Overland team. In 2019, she won the women's edition of the Dirty Kanza 200 gravel race.

In road racing, Rockwell was a member of UCI Women's Team  between 2017 and 2019.

References

External links
 

1993 births
Living people
American female cyclists
People from Berkeley, California
21st-century American women